Thomas Madefray (died 1375) was a Canon of Windsor from 1355 to 1375.

Career

He was appointed:
Clerk to Edward, Prince of Wales
Rector of Bradninch, Devon 1349
Prebendary of Wells
Prebendary of Glasney 1348-9

He was appointed to the eleventh stall in St George's Chapel, Windsor Castle in 1355 and held the canonry until 1375.

Notes 

1375 deaths
Canons of Windsor
Year of birth unknown